The Liberty Baptist Church is a historic African-American Baptist church located at 701 Oak St. in Evansville, Indiana.  It was founded in 1865 as a congregation of former slaves, according to Historic Evansville.  The Gothic Revival red brick church was built in 1887, as a replacement after a cyclone destroyed an earlier building.

It was listed on the National Register of Historic Places in 1978.

References

African-American history of Indiana
Churches on the National Register of Historic Places in Indiana
Gothic Revival church buildings in Indiana
Churches completed in 1886
Churches in Evansville, Indiana
Baptist churches in Indiana
National Register of Historic Places in Evansville, Indiana